The 21st Guam Legislature was a meeting of the Guam Legislature. It convened in Hagatna, Guam on January 7, 1991 and ended on January 4, 1993, during the 1st and 2nd years of Joseph F. Ada's 2nd Gubernatorial Term.

In the 1990 Guamanian general election, the Democratic Party of Guam won an eleven-to-ten (11-10) majority of seats in the Guam Legislature.

Marilyn A.P. Won Pat died on December 15, 1990, before taking office. The vacancy in the legislature caused by her death was filled by a special election held on April 6, 1991, where Madeleine Z. Bordallo was elected.

Party Summary

Membership

References 

Politics of Guam
Political organizations based in Guam
Legislature of Guam